Epfig is a commune in the Bas-Rhin department in Alsace in north-eastern France.

On the outskirts of the village is the 11th century Chapel of Saint Margaret. Epfig station has rail connections to Strasbourg and Sélestat.

See also
 Communes of the Bas-Rhin department

References

Communes of Bas-Rhin